The 1953 Toronto Argonauts finished in fourth place in the Interprovincial Rugby Football Union with a 5–9 record and failed to make the playoffs.

Regular season

Standings

Schedule

References

Toronto Argonauts seasons
1953 Canadian football season by team